The 2017 Campbell Fighting Camels football team represented Campbell University in the 2017 NCAA Division I FCS football season. They were be led by fifth-year head coach Mike Minter and played their home games at Barker–Lane Stadium. They were members of the Pioneer Football League until the end of the 2017 season before transitioning to the Big South Conference for the 2018 season. They finished the season 6–5, 5–3 in PFL play to finish in a three-way tie for third place.

Schedule

Source:

Game summaries

Methodist

Georgetown

at Presbyterian

at Stetson

Morehead State

Valparaiso

at Dayton

at Butler

Jacksonville

at Davidson

Drake

References

Campbell
Campbell Fighting Camels football seasons
Campbell Fighting Camels football